Ilya Yuryevich Zinin (born 9 November 1986) is a former Russian professional football player.

Club career
He made his Russian Football National League debut for FC Torpedo Vladimir on 4 April 2011 in a game against FC Alania Vladikavkaz.

External links
 

1986 births
People from Vladimir, Russia
Living people
Russian footballers
Association football midfielders
FC Rotor Volgograd players
FC Torpedo Vladimir players
Sportspeople from Vladimir Oblast